Catriona columbiana, the British Columbia aeolid, is a species of sea slug, an aeolid nudibranch, a marine gastropod mollusc in the family Trinchesiidae.

Distribution
This species was described from Gabriola Pass, Nanaimo, Vancouver Island, British Columbia, Canada. has been recorded along the Eastern Pacific coastline of North America from Cutter Rock, Ketchikan, Alaska, to San Diego, California.

Ecology
Catriona columbiana feeds on the athecate hydroids Tubularia and Syncoryne.

References

Trinchesiidae
Gastropods described in 1922